Caveolin-1 is a protein that in humans is encoded by the CAV1 gene.

Function 

The scaffolding protein encoded by this gene is the main component of the caveolae plasma membranes found in most cell types. The protein links integrin subunits to the tyrosine kinase FYN, an initiating step in coupling integrins to the Ras-ERK pathway and promoting cell cycle progression. The gene is a tumor suppressor gene candidate and a negative regulator of the Ras-p42/44 MAP kinase cascade. CAV1 and CAV2 are located next to each other on chromosome 7 and express colocalizing proteins that form a stable hetero-oligomeric complex. By using alternative initiation codons in the same reading frame, two isoforms (alpha and beta) are encoded by a single transcript from this gene.

Interactions 

Caveolin 1 has been shown to interact with heterotrimeric G proteins,
Src tyrosine kinases (Src, Lyn) and H-Ras, 
cholesterol,
TGF beta receptor 1, 
endothelial NOS, 
androgen receptor, 
amyloid precursor protein, 
gap junction protein, alpha 1,
nitric oxide synthase 2A, epidermal growth factor receptor, endothelin receptor type B, PDGFRB, PDGFRA, PTGS2, TRAF2, estrogen receptor alpha, caveolin 2, PLD2, Bruton's tyrosine kinase, and SCP2. All these interactions are through a caveolin-scaffolding domain (CSD) within caveolin-1 molecule. Molecules that interact with caveolin-1 contain caveolin-binding motifs (CBM).

See also 
 Caveolin

References

Further reading 

 
 
 
 
 

Genes
Human proteins